The 9th Parliament of Queen Elizabeth I was summoned by Queen Elizabeth I of England on 23 August 1597 and assembled on 24 October following. The Parliament was summoned to discuss the problems of food shortages and the need for social and economic legislation to deal with the consequential social problems. The speaker was Sir Christopher Yelverton, the Member of Parliament (MP) for Northampton

On 5 November Francis Bacon, the MP for Ipswich, tabled a motion on tillage, enclosure and depopulation, introducing two bills to reduce enclosed pasture land in favour of arable food-producing land, which were passed in a heavily redrafted form. Other bills designed to keep down the price of corn and to restrict the wearing of elaborate clothing were rejected. Several other bills to provide relief for the poor and homeless were passed.

Taxation bills to support the war against Spain at home and on the continent and to deal with chronic unrest in Ireland were approved. A petition to the Queen for an investigation into monopolies elicited a reply that their lawfulness would be examined. In total 28 public and 15 private measures received the royal assent.

The Parliament was dissolved on 9 February 1598.

Notable Acts of the Parliament
 Vagabonds Act 1597
 Hospitals for the Poor Act 1597
 Newport and Caerleon Bridges over Usk Act 1597

See also
 Acts of the 9th Parliament of Elizabeth I
 List of MPs elected to the English parliament in 1597
 List of parliaments of England

References

 

1597 establishments in England
1597 in politics